Arthrostylidium merostachyoides  is a species of Arthrostylidium bamboo in the grass family.

Distribution 
Anthrostylidium merostachyoides is endemic to Costa Rica in Central America.

References

merostachyoides